Gift Rap was a Christmas compilation album released by Cross Movement Records (CMR) on October 26, 2004. It featured both CMR artists and others. Production by Kevin Arthur, EarthQuake, D. Hackley, Lee Jerkins, So Hot Productions, Maji, Official, Rodney Rockers, Tru-Life. The album was re-released in October 2006 with new cover artwork.

Track listing
Tell You Why – Da' T.R.U.T.H.
Came Down – The Ambassador feat. La'Tia & Keran
Happy Birthday to Who? – The Tonic feat. Ron J
Read the Book – J. Johnson feat. Michelle Bonilla
On This Day – J.R.
Love Does – Phanatik feat. Ruth Gado
The King’s Speech – M.O.D.
Invasion Day – FLAME
Different Kind of Christmas – T.R.U.-L.I.F.E.
Wisemen – The Cross Movement

2004 compilation albums
2004 Christmas albums
Cross Movement Records albums